William Henry West (September 1842 – September 6, 1915) was an African American soldier and police officer in Washington, DC said to have arrested United States President Ulysses S. Grant in 1872. This is the only known record of a sitting US president being arrested.

Early life
West was born in Prince George's County, Maryland. In his youth, he was enslaved. He later fought in the American Civil War in Company K, 30th United States Colored Infantry formed in May 1863, which later fought in the Battle of the Crater. He was one of two Black policemen working for the Washington DC Police Department during Reconstruction. He was later remembered as "gentlemanly" and fond of good horses, especially fast ones. 
He married Katherine 'Kate' Bowie in Washington, D.C. on 11 June 1867, with whom he had six children. West was appointed to the Metropolitan police force on August 1, 1871.

Arrest of Grant
In one version of various stories relating to West and Grant, in 1872 West was patrolling on foot near 13th and M Streets in Washington DC, when he stopped the President for speeding in his horse and buggy and released with a warning for excessive speed. The next day, West observed Grant repeating the behavior, and arrested him.

Grant was taken to the police station and released on a $20 bond. Grant did not contest the fine or arrest.

References

External links

1842 births
1915 deaths
African-American police officers
African Americans in the American Civil War
19th-century American slaves
Metropolitan Police Department of the District of Columbia officers
People from Prince George's County, Maryland
People of Maryland in the American Civil War
Ulysses S. Grant
Union Army soldiers